The ProA Young Player of the Year Award is an award that is handed out to the best young player (under-22) of a given ProA season. The ProA is the second highest basketball division of Germany. The award was first handed out in the inaugural 2007–08 ProA season, to Per Günther of Phoenix Hagen.

Winners

References

Basketball most valuable player awards
European basketball awards
ProA